is a former Japanese football player.

Club career
Ito was born in Akita Prefecture on September 7, 1975. After dropped out from Kokushikan University, he joined Nagoya Grampus Eight in 1996. However he did not play much.  He moved to Kyoto Purple Sanga in July 1999, but was not put into play. He moved to the J2 League club Vegalta Sendai in 2000 and played often. He then moved to Shonan Bellmare in 2001. However he did not play much while there and retired at the end of the 2001 season.

National team career
In April 1995, when Ito was a Kokushikan University student, he was selected for the Japan U-20 national team to play in the 1995 World Youth Championship. He wore the number 10 shirt for Japan and played in three matches.

Club statistics

References

External links

sports.geocities.jp

1975 births
Living people
Kokushikan University alumni
Association football people from Akita Prefecture
Japanese footballers
Japan youth international footballers
J1 League players
J2 League players
Nagoya Grampus players
Kyoto Sanga FC players
Vegalta Sendai players
Shonan Bellmare players
Association football midfielders